William Douglas was a Scottish football goalkeeper. He was born in Dundee. He played for Ardwick, Newton Heath, Derby County, Blackpool, Warmley and Dundee.

Blackpool
Douglas made his debut for Blackpool in their first-ever match in the Football League, on 5 September 1896. He went on to be ever-present in the club's 30 games that season, keeping five clean sheets in the process.

He was also ever-present in the following 1897–98 campaign, and achieved six clean sheets that time around. After those 60 games for the club, he was replaced for the 1898–99 season by F. A. Fletcher.

References

External links
MUFCInfo.com profile

Footballers from Dundee
Scottish footballers
Association football goalkeepers
Manchester City F.C. players
Manchester United F.C. players
Derby County F.C. players
Blackpool F.C. players
Dundee F.C. players
Year of death missing
English Football League players
Year of birth missing
Warmley F.C. players